Mount Zāwiya or Mount Rīḥā (also in medieval times: Banī-ʻUlaym Mountain is a highland region in Idlib Governorate in northwestern Syria. Around 36 towns and villages exist in the Mount Zawiya region. The biggest towns are Rīḥā (Arīḥā) and Maʻarrat an-Nuʻmān.

It was the location of the December 2011 Jabal al-Zawiya massacres. It was bombed again as part of a Syrian government and Russian offensive in September 2017.

Location and description

Mount Zāwiya forms the southern group of the Limestone Massif of the western Aleppo plateau. 
To the north and northwest of the mountain lies the Rouge Plain. The Ghāb Plain is on the western side. South of the mountain are the plains of Ḥamā, and on the eastern side are the plains of Idlib.

The average elevation of Mount Zāwiya is 750 m. The highest point is Mount Ayyūb (939 m). The western side of the mountain is steep, but the eastern side slopes gradually. Many springs and streams arise on the western side and drain into the Rouge and Ghāb plains.

The mountain includes two masses separated by a valley which has many archaeological sites, such as the ancient city of Bārā. The northern part of the mountain is called Mount Arbaʻīn (877 m). The ancient city of Ebla stands northeast of the mountain, and the ancient city of Apamea stands in the southwest.

References

 
Idlib Governorate
Mountains of Syria